Perisserosa is a genus of sea snails, cowries, marine gastropod mollusks in the family Cypraeidae, the cowries.

Species 
Species within the genus Perisserosa include:
 Perisserosa guttata (Gmelin, 1791)
Synonyms=
 Perisserosa brocktoni Iredale, 1930: synonym of Perisserosa guttata (Gmelin, 1791)

References

External links 
 Iredale, T. (1930). Queensland molluscan notes, No. 2. Memoirs of the Queensland Museum. 10(1): 73-88, pl. 9
 In Spanish, a text on the family that mentions this genus

Cypraeidae